"I'll Be Missing You" is a song by American rapper Puff Daddy and American singer Faith Evans, featuring R&B group 112, in memory of fellow Bad Boy Records artist (and Evans's husband) Christopher "The Notorious B.I.G." Wallace, who was murdered on March 9, 1997. Released as the second single from Puff Daddy and the Family's debut album, No Way Out (1997), "I'll Be Missing You" samples the Police's 1983 hit song "Every Breath You Take" with an interpolated chorus sung by Evans and interpolated rhythm. The song also interpolates the 1929 Albert E. Brumley hymn "I'll Fly Away" and features a spoken intro over a choral version of Samuel Barber's "Adagio for Strings".

At the 40th Annual Grammy Awards, the song won the Grammy Award for Best Rap Performance by a Duo or Group. The single spent eleven weeks atop the US Billboard Hot 100 and reached number one in 15 other countries; it was the best-performing single of 1997 in Iceland, the Netherlands (Dutch Top 40), and Romania. With shipments of over three million copies in the United States and over one million in both Germany and the United Kingdom, the song has become one of the best-selling singles of all time.

Composition
"I'll Be Missing You" is based on a sample of the 1983 single "Every Breath You Take" by The Police. It also uses an interpolation of the "Every Breath You Take" melody, sung by Biggie's widow, Faith Evans. Permission was not given for use of the sample, and Police songwriter Sting sued, receiving 100% of the song royalties. Sting reportedly earns $2,000 a day from royalties for the track. Police guitarist Andy Summers called the sample "a major rip-off", and told the A.V. Club: "I found out about it after it was on the radio ... I’d be walking round Tower Records, and the fucking thing would be playing over and over. It was very bizarre while it lasted." Sting later performed the song alongside Puff Daddy and Evans at the 1997 MTV Video Music Awards in September.

The track also reuses the melody from the hymn 'I'll Fly Away". Combs's verses were composed by rapper Sauce Money. Combs had originally asked Jay-Z to write the track, but he turned it down and suggested that Sauce Money write the track instead.

Critical reception
Tom Sinclair from Entertainment Weekly gave the song a grade of D, describing it as a "maudlin 'tribute' to the Notorious B.I.G., [in which] the late rapper's former mentor (Puff Daddy) and wife (Faith Evans) team up to say their farewells to the big man on a song that 'samples' The Police's 'Every Breath You Take'. With lyrics like 'Know you're in heaven, smiling down/Watching us while we pray for you,' 'I'll Be Missing You' gives the lie to those who claim hip-hoppers are above self-serving sentimentality." British magazine Music Week rated it four out of five, calling it a "dignified tribute". Also James Hyman from RM gave the song four out of five, noting that "once again, blatant plundering from an Eighties groove forms the basis for an instant pop-rap crossover." 

David Fricke from Rolling Stone wrote, "In "I'll Be Missing You", he didn't merely crib from Sting; he took a song about stalking and transformed it into a radiant hymn of brotherly love and a community's loss." Freelance music writer Jeremy Simmonds described it as "somewhat turgid". Ian Hyland from Sunday Mirror rated it nine out of ten, commenting, "Not the greatest rap I've ever heard but this tribute to murdered rapper Notorious B.I.G. is going to be H.U.G.E. In a mish-mash of The Police's "Every Breath You Take" and John Waite's "Missing", the highlight is Faith Evans' amazing voice."

Chart performance
"I'll Be Missing You" topped many charts across the world. It reached number one in the United States, the United Kingdom, Australia, Austria, Denmark, Flanders, Germany, Iceland, Ireland, Lithuania, the Netherlands, New Zealand, Norway, Poland, Romania, Spain, Sweden and Switzerland.

The song debuted at number one on the US Billboard Hot 100, and the only rap song by a male to do so until Eminem's "Not Afraid" debuted at the top spot 13 years later in 2010. The song spent a record-breaking 11 weeks at number one on the Hot 100, making it the longest running number one hip hop song in history until Eminem's "Lose Yourself" spent 12 weeks at number one in 2002.

The song re-entered the UK Singles Chart at number 32 on July 8, 2007, 10 years after it had its full physical release and 10 years after it was number one. As of July 2013, "I'll Be Missing You" is the 22nd best-selling song all-time in the UK.

Music video
A music video was made to accompany the song, directed by American director Hype Williams and shot in Chicago. Portions of the video were filmed in the Helmut Jahn designed moving walkway tunnel that connects Concourses B and C in Terminal 1 at the O'Hare International Airport. The music video was added to BET and MTV on the week ending on May 11, 1997.

Formats and track listings
 CD single
 Puff Daddy featuring Faith Evans and 112 – "I'll Be Missing You"

 Maxi-single
 Puff Daddy featuring Faith Evans and 112 – "I'll Be Missing You"
 The Lox – "We'll Always Love Big Poppa"
 112 – "Cry On"
 Puff Daddy and Faith Evans featuring 112 – "I'll Be Missing You" 
 The Lox – "We'll Always Love Big Poppa"

Charts

Weekly charts

Year-end charts

Decade-end charts

All-time chart

Certifications and sales

Release history

See also

 List of best-selling singles
 List of best-selling singles in the United Kingdom
 List of Hot 100 number-one singles of 1997 (U.S.)
 List of European number-one hits of 1997
 List of number-one R&B singles of 1997 (U.S.)
 List of number-one singles of 1997 (Australia)
 List of number-one hits of 1997 (Austria)
 List of number-one singles of 1997 (Belgium-Flanders)
 List of number-one singles of 1997 (Germany)
 List of number-one singles of 1997 (Ireland)
 List of number-one singles of 1997 (Netherlands)
 List of number-one singles of 1997 (New Zealand)
 List of number-one singles of 1997 (Norway)
 List of number-one singles (Sweden)
 List of number-one singles of 1997 (Switzerland)
 List of UK Singles Chart number ones of 1997

References

112 (band) songs
1990s ballads
1997 singles
1997 songs
Bad Boy Records singles
Billboard Hot 100 number-one singles
Canadian Singles Chart number-one singles
Contemporary R&B ballads
Dutch Top 40 number-one singles
European Hot 100 Singles number-one singles
Faith Evans songs
Irish Singles Chart number-one singles
Music videos directed by Hype Williams
The Notorious B.I.G.
Number-one singles in Australia
Number-one singles in Austria
Number-one singles in Germany
Number-one singles in Iceland
Number-one singles in New Zealand
Number-one singles in Norway
Number-one singles in Romania
Number-one singles in Scotland
Number-one singles in Sweden
Number-one singles in Switzerland
Sampling controversies
Sean Combs songs
Commemoration songs
Songs involved in plagiarism controversies
Songs written by Faith Evans
Songs written by Sting (musician)
UK Singles Chart number-one singles
Ultratop 50 Singles (Flanders) number-one singles